Lluis Lucio (born 3 June 1958) is a Spanish equestrian. He competed in two events at the 2000 Summer Olympics.

References

External links
 

1958 births
Living people
Spanish male equestrians
Spanish dressage riders
Olympic equestrians of Spain
Equestrians at the 2000 Summer Olympics
Sportspeople from Barcelona